Ruth Brown (1928–2006) was an American singer-songwriter.

Ruth Brown may also refer to:

 Ruth Brown (librarian) (1891–1975), Oklahoma librarian and civil rights activist
 Ruth Snyder (1895–1928), née Brown, American executed for the murder of her husband
 Ruth Brown (writer), born 1941, British author and illustrator of children's books (see Kate Greenaway Medal)
 Ruth Brown (album), an album by American vocalist Ruth Brow